The Bor massacre was a massacre of an estimated 2,000 civilians in Bor on November 15, 1991 during the Second Sudanese Civil War. The massacre was carried out mostly by Nuer fighters from SPLA-Nasir, led by Riek Machar, and the militant group known as the Nuer White Army, shortly after Machar split off from the SPLA led by John Garang. Amnesty International said at least 2,000 Dinka were killed, though the real number may have been higher. In the years which followed, an estimated 25,000 more died from famine as their cattle were either stolen or shot and the fighting had displaced them from the land they had once cultivated. At the time, Riek Machar described the incident as "propaganda" and "myth". In 2012, he publicly apologized for his part in the massacre.

See also
Second Sudanese Civil War
Pibor massacre
2014 Bentiu massacre

References

Massacres in 1991
Crimes against humanity
Second Sudanese Civil War
Massacres in South Sudan
Massacres in Sudan
Mass murder in 1991
History of South Sudan
History of Sudan
November 1991 events in Africa
1991 murders in Sudan